Konstantin Trenchev (born 8 February 1955) is a Bulgarian medic and syndicalist who is the president of the Confederation of Labour Podkrepa.

Trenchev has received his education in the field of medicine. He has supported the use of European Union funds to help firms and individuals in being granted patents.

Trenchev is one of the founding members of the UDF and a member of the Coordinating Council of the Union of Democratic Forces. He established Confederation of Labour Podkrepa in February 1989, was reelected as its chairman in February 1997 and was persuaded to continue in this role at the CLP's 8th congress held in February 2011.

References 

1955 births
Living people
Union of Democratic Forces (Bulgaria) politicians
Politicians from Stara Zagora
21st-century Bulgarian physicians
20th-century Bulgarian physicians
21st-century Bulgarian politicians
20th-century Bulgarian politicians